Mollie Evelyn Moore Davis (Moore; pen name, M. E. M. Davis; April 12, 1844 - January 1, 1909) was an American poet, writer, and editor of the long nineteenth century. From the age of 14, she wrote regularly for the press and other periodicals. A critic said of her that she was "more thoroughly Texan in subject, in imagery and spirit than any of the Texas poets," and that scarcely any other than a native Texan could "appreciate all the merits of her poems, so strongly marked are they by the peculiarities of Texas scenery and patriotism." In 1889, Thomas Davis became editor of the New Orleans Picayune.

Early life and education
Mary Evalina Moore was born in Talladega, Alabama, April 12, 1844. She was the only daughter of Dr. John Moore and Lucy Crutchfield. Her father, born at Oxford, Massachusetts, after receiving classical training and graduating in medicine, had removed to Alabama. Her mother's family, from a Virginia family, was resident in Chattanooga, Tennessee, and two of her maternal uncles, Thomas and William, attained the rank of colonel, the former in the Confederate, the latter in the Union army. Her father distinguished himself as a pioneer in the manufacture of iron in Alabama, discovering the ore in 1848, smelting it with charcoal, and forging it into bars under a trip hammer operated by water power. A few years before the outbreak of the American Civil War, Dr. Moore removed to Texas with his family and engaged in the planting of cotton. It was there at La Rose Blanche Plantation, in Hays County on the banks of the San Marcos River that the early years of Davis were passed.

At La Rose Blanche Plantation, she received her education from private tutors, and there her talent for versification began to display itself. With her brother, she learned not only to read, but to ride, shoot and swim.

Career

In 1874, she married Major Thomas Edward Davis, for many years the editor of The Daily Picayune. The removed subsequently to New Orleans, and took up their residence in the centre of the old French Quarter. She was admitted into the innermost circle of the most exclusive Creole society, and enjoyed advantages for the study of it. She exploited these opportunities, making herself for many years a vital part of that society. At the same time, not being of Creole heritage, she was able to maintain a certain detachment and objectivity in point of view that lent especial value to her writing. She was careful to lay a solid foundation of accurate knowledge beneath her imaginative constructions, dedicating months of preliminary study of some historical circumstance or the understanding of some obscure tradition or custom connected with the plot of her story.

Poetry

Davis' first volume of poems, entitled Minding the Gap, and Other Poems (Houston, Texas) was published in 1867, and passed through further editions after being enlarged and corrected. Among the best known and most admired of Davis' short poems were "Going Out and Coming In," "San Marcos River," "Stealing Roses Through the Gate," "Lee at the Wilderness," and a few others found in collections of American verse. The mystic prose poem, "The Song of the Opal", the classical "Pere Dagobert," "Throwing the Wanga," "The Center rigger," and "The Elephant's Track," were written for Harper's Magazine, while many poems and sketches were published in other periodicals.

Short stories
It is in the short-story that Davis has perhaps achieved her greatest success. Many of these were written for the northern monthlies, and some were collected and republished in An Elephant's Track and Other Stories. Here she introduced a great variety of motifs as well as of incidents and characters. The lighter and more humorous aspects of life were her favorites. As a prose writer, Davis attracted as many readers and as much admiration as when she indulged in verses. Her short stories, such as "The Song of the Opal," "The Soul of Rose Dede," and "A Miracle," were well received, and a volume of sketches entitled In War Times at La Rose Blanche (Boston, 1888), elicited such commendations from the press as to call for a French translation for the columns of La Revue des Deux Mondes. "Keren Happuch and I" was a series of sketches contributed to the New Orleans Picayune. "Snaky baked a Hoe-Cake," "Grief" and others, contributed to Wide Awake in 1876, were among the first, if not the very first, African American Vernacular English stories which appeared in print.

Novels
The series of works in which Davis portrayed the life of Texas and Louisiana included the following: In War Times at La Rose Blanche Plantation (Lothrop and Company, Boston); Under the Man-Fig (Houghton, Mifflin and Company, Boston); An Elephant's Track, and Other Stories (Harper and Brothers, New York, 1897); The Story of Texas Under Six Flags (Ginn and Company, Boston, 1898); The Wire Cutters (Houghton, Mifflin and Company, 1899); The Queen's Garden (Houghton, Mifflin and Company, Boston, 1900); Jaconetta (Houghton, Mifflin and Company, Boston, 1901); The Little Chevalier (Houghton, Mifflin and Company, Boston, 1905); The Price of Silence (Houghton, Mifflin and Company, Boston, 1907); The Bunch of Roses (Small and Maynard, Boston). Of these In War Times at La Rose Blanche Plantation and Jaconetta were largely autobiographical, both dealing with the early years of the author's life, but in a modest and unobtrusive fashion that enlisted the interest of the reader in the many other characters that crowded her pages rather than in her own. "Jaconetta" was Davis's childhood nickname at La Rose Blanche during the American Civil War. 

Under Six Flags is a child's history of the "Lone Star State", in which the romantic features are brought out distinctly, and annalistic details, without sacrifice of historical accuracy, are subordinated to humanistic interests and dramatic effect. It is in fact a Tendenzschrift well calculated to arouse the State pride of Texan youth.

The life in Texas furnishes the background for two other books in this list: Under the Man-Fig and The Wire Cutters, both to be numbered with her more important works, and both developing ingenious and rather complicated plots through which love stories are guided to the end. Davis' novel Under the Man-Fig, was described by a reviewer as "a tale at once strongly dramatic, clean and artistic," while her work generally is described by the same writer as being "characterized by a keen sense of humor, a fine restrained pathos and a delicate play of fancy."
In the Queen's Garden is an idyl whose scene is laid in New Orleans. It is in The Little Chevalier, by many regarded as her masterpiece, and The Price of Silence that Davis made the most minute and painstaking study of Creole life, manners, and character.

Literary style and themes
In all of her stories, it is the pictorial effect that is chiefly sought and most successfully attained. Davis leaves subtle psychological analysis to others. She shows little concern with the problems of heredity and environment, of character evolution, and of the play of emotions and motives. The great elemental feelings in general suffice for her purposes. She is especially desirous of producing a vivid picture in the mind of the reader. She wishes to depict a situation that shall be convincing. To this end, she summons all the resources of her own personal knowledge and observation, and employs all her powers of animated description.

Almost equally prominent with this pictorial quality is the joy in narrative. The story-telling instinct is strong in Davis. She is very happy in the employment of Afro-American superstitions, which she uses not merely for artistic purposes, to enliven a scene or to impart local color to a situation, but also effectively often as causal agencies in the interlinkage of incidents constituting the plot of her story. She understands the Afro-American character well, and loves to depict it. Her management of the Afro-American dialect is good, but she is discreetly sparing, however happy, in her use of such forms of illiterature.

Personal life
In 1874, she married Major Thomas Edward Davis, of Virginia, for many years associated with the Houston Telegram, who later served as editor-in-chief of the Picayune. In 1880, the couple made their home in New Orleans, and every year their historic house in Royal Street received people in town, both French and American residents. With all her social cares, she found time for reading and study and hospitality. She was an accomplished French scholar as well as a lover and student of Spanish literature. She was president of the "Geographies", a literary circle, and vice-president of the "Quarante", a large and fashionable literary club. In both those organizations, she was recognized as a mental guide, philosopher and friend.

Moore died at her home in New Orleans on January 1, 1909.

Notes

References

Attribution

Bibliography

External links
 
Official website

1844 births
1909 deaths
19th-century American women writers
19th-century American poets
People from Talladega, Alabama
American women poets
Writers from Alabama
Wikipedia articles incorporating text from A Woman of the Century